The 2004 North Carolina Senate elections were held on November 2, 2004 to elect members to all fifty seats in the North Carolina Senate. The election coincided with the elections for other offices including the Presidency, U.S. Senate, Governorship, U.S. House of Representatives, Council of State, and state house. The primary election was held on July 20, 2004 with  a primary run-off occurring on August 17, 2004. These elections were the first to use new district lines drawn by the General Assembly to account the for changes in population amongst each of the districts after the 2000 census. The 2002 elections had been conducted under a map ordered by the North Carolina Superior Court.

Results Summary

Incumbents defeated in primary election
John Carrington (R-District 15), defeated by Neal Hunt (R)

Incumbents defeated in general election
Cecil Hargett (D-District 6), defeated by Harry Brown (R)
Joe Sam Queen (D-District 47), defeated by Keith Presnell (R)
Bob Carpenter (R-District 50), defeated by John Snow (D)

Newly created seats
District 7, won by Doug Berger (D)
District 30, won by Don East (R)
District 40, won by Malcolm Graham (D)
District 44, won by Jim Jacumin (R)

Seats eliminated by redistricting
Tony Moore (R-District 5) lost a redistricting race to John Kerr (D)
Bob Rucho (R-District 39) didn't seek re-election after the 40th district was merged with his district
R. B. Sloan Jr. (R-District 41) lost re-nomination to James Forrester (R-District 42) after the 42nd district was merged with the 41st district
Virginia Foxx (R-District 45) ran for the U.S. House after the 30th district was merged with her district.

Detailed Results

Districts 1-25

District 1
Incumbent Democratic President Pro Tempore Marc Basnight has represented the 1st district since 1985.

District 2
Incumbent Democrat Scott Thomas has represented the 2nd district and its predecessors since 2001.

District 3
Incumbent Democrat Clark Jenkins has represented the 3rd district since 2003.

District 4
Incumbent Democrat Robert Holloman has represented the 4th district since 2003.

District 5
The new 5th district includes the homes of Incumbent Democrat turned Republican Tony Moore, who has represented the 5th district since 2003 and Incumbent Democrat John Kerr, who has represented the 7th district and its predecessors since 1993. Kerr defeated Moore in the general election.

District 6
Incumbent Democrat Cecil Hargett has represented the 6th district since 2003. Hargett lost re-election to Republican Harry Brown.

District 7
The new 7th district includes all of Franklin, Granville, Vance, and Warren Counties. Democrat Doug Berger won the open seat.

District 8
Incumbent Democrat R. C. Soles Jr. has represented the 8th district and its predecessors since 1977.

District 9
Incumbent Republican Minority Leader Patrick Ballantine had represented the 9th district and its predecessors since 1995. Ballantine ran for Governor and resigned his seat on April 20, 2004. Fellow Republican Woody White was appointed to replace him on May 5, 2004. White ran for re-election to a full term, but he lost re-election to Democrat Julia Boseman.

District 10
Incumbent Democrat Charles Albertson has represented the 10th district and its predecessors since 1993.

District 11
Incumbent Democrat A.B. Swindell has represented the 11th district and its predecessors since 2001.

District 12
Incumbent Republican Fred Smith has represented the 12th district since 2003.

District 13
Incumbent Democrat David Weinstein has represented the 13th district and its predecessors since 1997.

District 14
incumbent Democrat Vernon Malone has represented the 14th district since 2003.

District 15
Incumbent Republican John Carrington has represented the 15th district and its predecessors since 1995. Carrington lost re-nomination to fellow Republican Neal Hunt, who won the general election.

District 16
Incumbent Democrat Eric Miller Reeves has represented the 16th district and its predecessors since 1997. Reeves retired and Democrat Janet Cowell won the open seat.

District 17
Incumbent Republican Richard Stevens has represented the 17th district since 2003.

District 18
Incumbent Democrat Wib Gulley, who had represented the 18th district and its predecessors since 1993, resigned on March 19, 2004. Ralph Alexander Hunt was appointed to finish Hunt's term on April 21, 2004. Hunt didn't seek a full term and Democrat Bob Atwater won the open seat.

District 19
Incumbent Democratic Majority Leader Tony Rand has represented the 19th district and its predecessors since 1995.

District 20
Incumbent Democrat Jeanne Lucas has represented the 20th district and its predecessors since 1993.

District 21
Incumbent Democrat Larry Shaw has represented the 21st district and its predecessors since 1995.

District 22
Incumbent Republican Harris Blake has represented the 22nd district since 2003.

District 23
Incumbent Democrat Eleanor Kinnaird has represented the 23rd district and its predecessors since 1997.

District 24
Incumbent Republican Hugh Webster has represented the 24th district since 1995.

District 25
Incumbent Democrat Bill Purcell has represented the 25th district and its predecessors since 1997.

Districts 26-50

District 26
Incumbent Republican Phil Berger has represented the 26th district and its predecessors since 2001.

District 27
Incumbent Democrat Kay Hagan has represented the 27th district and its predecessors since 1999.

District 28
Incumbent Democrat Katie Dorsett has represented the 28th district since 2003.

District 29
Incumbent Republican Jerry Tillman has represented the 29th district since 2003.

District 30
The new 30th district includes all of Alleghany, Stokes, Surry, and Yadkin counties and has no incumbent. Republican Don East won the open seat.

District 31
Incumbent Republican Hamilton Horton Jr. has represented the 31st district and its predecessors since 1995.

District 32
Incumbent Democrat Linda Garrou has represented the 32nd district and its predecessors since 1999.

District 33
Incumbent Republican Stan Bingham has represented the 33rd district and its predecessors since 2001.

District 34
Incumbent Republican Andrew Brock has represented the 34th district since 2003.

District 35
Incumbent Republican Fern Shubert has represented the 35th district since 2003. Shubert ran for Governor. Fellow Republican Eddie Goodall won the open seat.

District 36
Incumbent Republican Fletcher Hartsell Jr. has represented the 36th district and its predecessors since 1991.

District 37
Incumbent Democrat Dan Clodfelter has represented the 37th district and its predecessors since 1999.

District 38
Incumbent Democrat Charlie Dannelly has represented the 38th district and its predecessors since 1995.

District 39
The new 39th distirct includes the homes of incumbent Republicans Bob Rucho, who has represented the 39th district and its predecessors since 1997, and Robert Pittenger, who has represented the 40th district since 2003. Rucho retired and Pittenger was elected here.

District 40
The new 40th district is based in Mecklenburg County and had no incumbent. Democrat Maclom Graham won the open seat.

District 41
The new 41st district includes the homes of incumbent Republicans R. B. Sloan Jr., who has represented the 41st district since 2003, and James Forrester, who has represented the 42nd district and its predecessors since 1991. Forrester defeated Sloan in the Republican primary and was re-elected here.

District 42
The new 42nd district overlaps with much of the former 44th district. Incumbent Republican Austin Allran, who has represented the 44th district and its predecessors since 1987, was re-elected here.

District 43
Incumbent Democrat David Hoyle has represented the 43rd district and its predecessors since 1993.

District 44
The new 44th district includes all of Burke and Caldwell counties and has no incumbent. Republican Jim Jacumin won the open seat.

District 45
The new 45th district includes the homes of Incumbent Republicans Virginia Foxx, who has represented the 45th district and its predecessors since 1995, and John Garwood, who has represented the 30th district and its predecessors since 1997. Foxx ran for the U.S. House and Garwood was re-elected here.

District 46
Incumbent Democrat Walter Dalton has represented the 46th district and its predecessors since 1997.

District 47
Incumbent Democrat Joe Sam Queen has represented the 47th district since 2003. Queen lost re-election to Republican Keith Presnell.

District 48
Incumbent Republican Tom Apodaca has represented the 48th district since 2003.

District 49
Incumbent Democrat Martin Nesbitt has represented the 49th district since his appointment in 2004. Nesbitt was elected to a full term.

District 50
Incumbent Republican Bob Carpenter has represented the 50th district and its predecessors since 1989. Carpenter lost re-election to Democrat John Snow.

References

2004
2004 state legislature elections in the United States
Senate, North Carolina